People with the surname Insall include:

 Donald Insall (born 1926), British architect, conservationist and author
 Gilbert Stuart Martin Insall (1894–1972), British pilot in the Royal Flying Corps and Royal Air Force
 John Insall (1930–2000), pioneering English orthopaedic surgeon who spent most of his career in the United States
 Robert Insall (born 1965), British cell & computational biologist